Lawrence Ennali (born 7 March 2002) is a German footballer who plays as a winger for Rot-Weiss Essen, on loan from Hannover 96.

Career
Ennali made his professional debut for Hannover 96 in the 2. Bundesliga on 14 August 2021 against Dynamo Dresden, coming on in the 74th minute as a substitute for Hendrik Weydandt. The away match finished as a 2–0 loss for Hannover.

References

External links
 
 
 
 

2002 births
Living people
Footballers from Berlin
German footballers
Association football forwards
Hannover 96 II players
Hannover 96 players
Rot-Weiss Essen players
2. Bundesliga players
3. Liga players
Regionalliga players